Iziaslav may refer to:

 Iziaslav, Ukraine, a city
 Iziaslav Raion, a former raion in Khmelnytskyi Oblast in Ukraine
 Iziaslav IV Vladimirovich (born 1186)
 Iziaslav (Brutskiy) (1926–2007), primate of the Belarusian Autocephalous Orthodox Church
 Iziaslav of Kiev (disambiguation), several people

See also
 Iziaslav Vladimirovich (disambiguation)